Microdorcadion laosense is a species of beetle in the family Cerambycidae. It was described by Stephan von Breuning in 1950. It is known from Laos.

References

Morimopsini
Beetles described in 1950